Echinochasmus is a genus of trematodes in the family Echinochasmidae.

Species
Echinochasmus cohensi Rao, 1951
Echinochasmus dietzevi Issaitschikov, 1927
Echinochasmus donaldsoni Beaver, 1941
Echinochasmus mohiuddini Dharejo, Bilqees & Khan, 2007
Echinochasmus mordax (Looss, 1899)
Echinochasmus skrjabini (Oshmarin, 1947)
Echinochasmus perfoliatus

References

Echinostomata
Plagiorchiida genera